is a railway station on the Ōu Main Line in Daisen, Akita, Japan, operated by JR East.

Lines
Ugo-Sakai Station is served by the Ōu Main Line, and is located 271.9 km from the terminus of the line at Fukushima Station.

Station layout
The station consists of a single island platform connected to the station building by a footbridge. The tracks of the Akita Shinkansen run parallel to the outside of the track on Platform 2. The station is attended.

Platforms

History
It was renamed Ugo-Sakai Station on July 1, 1919. The station was absorbed into the JR East network upon the privatization of JNR on April 1, 1987. A new station building was completed in February 2004.。

Passenger statistics
In fiscal 2018, the station was used by an average of 197 passengers daily (boarding passengers only).

Surrounding area
 Former Kyōwa town hall
 Kyōwa post office

References

External links

 JR East Station information 

Railway stations in Japan opened in 1904
Railway stations in Akita Prefecture
Ōu Main Line
Daisen, Akita